Mihrabad may refer to:
 Mihrabad, Hamadan
 Mihrabad, Isfahan
 Mihrabad, Khvaf, Razavi Khorsaan Province
 Mihrabad, Sabzevar, Razavi Khorsaan Province
 Mihrabad, Yazd
 Mihrabat Nature Park, a protected area at Kanlıca neighborhood of Beykoz, Istanbul in Turkey

See also
 Mehrabad (disambiguation)